Stadio Gian Domenico Tursi is a multi-use stadium in Martina Franca, Italy.  It is currently used mostly for football matches and is the home ground of A.C. Martina.  The stadium holds 4,900.

References

Gian Domenico Tursi
Martina Franca